Charles Raymond Plott (born July 8, 1938) is an American economist. He currently is Edward S. Harkness Professor of Economics and Political Science at the California Institute of Technology, Director, Laboratory for Experimental Economics and Political Science, and a pioneer in the field of experimental economics.  His research is focused on the basic principles of process performance and the use of those principles in the design of new, decentralized processes to solve complex problems.  Applications are found in mechanisms for allocating complex items such as the markets for pollution permits in Southern California, the FCC auction of licenses for Personal Communication Systems, the auctions for electric power in California, the allocation of landing rights at the major U.S. airports, access of private trains to public railway tracks, access to natural gas pipelines, the allocation of licenses for offshore aquaculture sites, the combinatorial sale of fleets of vehicles, and the application of complex procurements.  Plott has contributed extensively to the development and application of a laboratory experimental methodology in the fields of economics and political science.

Awards and memberships

Memberships include National Academy of Sciences, 2007; American Academy of Arts and Sciences, 1985; Distinguished Fellow of American Economic Association; Centre for Market Design, Victoria, Board Member; Fellow of the Econometric Society; Public Choice Society, President 1976-1978; Southern Economic Association, Executive Committee 1977-1978, vice president 1985-1987, president 1989-90; Economic Science Association, president 1987-1988; Western Economic Association International, vice president, 1996, president 1999.

Recent awards include GAIM Research Paper of the Year 2006 Award; Economic Inquiry 2006 Best Article; GSAM Quant Best Paper Prize, Review of Finance; Journal of Financial Markets 2003 Best Paper Award; Journal of Finance Markets Award, and others.

Charles Plott has held the positions of president of the Society for the Advancement of Economic Theory, president of the Western Economic Association International, and others.

Professional appointments

Plott's professional appointments include: National Research Council's Committee on Proposed Revisions to the Common Rule in Relation to Behavioral and Social Sciences; Economic Theory - Member, Editorial Board; Chairman, California Institute of Technology Institutional Review Board, National Research Council's Commission on Behavioral and Social Sciences and Education – Board on Behavioral, cognitive, and Sensory Sciences; The Lee Center for Advanced Networking, as well as others.

2002 Nobel Laureate Vernon L. Smith lauded Plott in his speech of thanks at the Nobel Banquet, December 10, 2002 with a toast to "The pioneering influence of Sidney Siegel, Amos Tversky, Martin Shubik, and Charles Plott on the intellectual movement that culminated in the economics award for 2002." In addition, the prize committee recognized Plott's contribution to the field.

Education

Plott received his education from the University of Virginia, PhD; Oklahoma State University, M.S., B.S.

Books

Plott is the author of numerous scholarly books and publications.  A selection is:

 The Allocation of Scarce Resources:  Experimental Economics and the Problem of Allocating Airport Slots, D. M. Grether, R. Mark Isaac, and C.R. Plott,. Volume in series Underground Classics in Economics, K. Arrow, J. Heckman, P. Pechman, T. Sargent, and R. Solow, editors.  Boulder, CO:  Westview Press, 1989.
 Designer Markets:  Laboratory Experimental Methods in Economics, Volume 4, Number 1, 1994, Economic Theory.  Charles R. Plott, guest editor.
 Public Economics, Political Processes and Policy Applications.  Collected Papers on the Experimental Foundations of Economics and Political Science, Volume One.  Cheltenham, UK:  Edward Elgar Publishing (2001).
 Market Institutions and Price Discovery. Collected Papers on the Experimental Foundations of Economics and Political Science, Volume Two.  Cheltenham, UK: Edward Elgar Publishing (2001).
 Information, Finance and General Equilibrium. Collected Papers on the Experimental Foundations of Economics and Political Science, Volume Three.  Cheltenham, UK:  Edward Elgar Publishing (2001).
 Handbook of Experimental Economic Results, Volume 1.  Edited by C. R. Plott and V.L. Smith, Elsevier North-Holland Publishing (2008).

Patents
 Amusement devices and games including means for processing electronic data where ultimate outcome of the game is dependent on relative odds of a card combination and/or where chance is a factor: expected biases such as long shot and favorite bias, (2011).

Notes

External links
Laboratory for Experimental Economics and Political Science
Economics as an Experimental Science - Lecture from Melbourne University
 - University of Canterbury, Christchurch, New Zealand, John Bell Condliffe Lecture in Economics

1938 births
Living people
American economists
California Institute of Technology faculty
Fellows of the American Academy of Arts and Sciences
Members of the United States National Academy of Sciences
Fellows of the Econometric Society
Distinguished Fellows of the American Economic Association
Member of the Mont Pelerin Society